XDR may refer to:
 XDR (audio) or eXtended Dynamic Range, a quality-control system for pre-recorded audio cassettes
 XDR (video game), for the Sega Mega Drive
 XDR DRAM, a type of computer memory
 XDR Schema, a discontinued schema language for XML documents
 External Data Representation, a data interoperability format
 Extensively drug-resistant, a category of multiple drug resistance
 Special drawing rights, a monetary unit of the International Monetary Fund (ISO 4217 currency code XDR)
 Extended detection and response, a cyber security technology that monitors and mitigates cyber security threats